Kenneth Wahl Hatfield (born June 6, 1943) is a former American football player and coach.  He served as the head football coach at the United States Air Force Academy (1979–1983), the University of Arkansas (1984–1989), Clemson University (1990–1993), and Rice University (1994–2005), compiling a career college football record of 168–140–4.

Playing career
Hatfield is a graduate of the University of Arkansas, where he starred at defensive back for the 1964 team that won a share of the national championship. His punt return for a touchdown helped Arkansas beat the #1 Texas Longhorns, 14-13, in the 1964 game in Austin. Hatfield was a first team All-American punt returner for the 1964 season. Among his teammates were future Dallas Cowboys head coach Jimmy Johnson and future Dallas Cowboys owner Jerry Jones.  He is a member of the Sigma Chi fraternity.

Coaching career

Air Force

Hatfield began his college head coaching career at the United States Air Force Academy from 1979 to 1983.  He gradually rebuilt a program that had struggled through most of the 1970s and laid the foundation for its success in the 1980s and early 1990s under his offensive coordinator and successor, Fisher DeBerry.  By his final year, the Falcons were ranked 13th in the country by the Coaches' Poll and 15th in the AP Poll—their first appearance in a final poll since 1970.

Arkansas
Hatfield then moved to his alma mater, Arkansas, where he compiled a 55–17–1 record from 1984 to 1989.  His teams won two straight Southwest Conference titles in 1988 and 1989, a feat that the Razorbacks had not accomplished since his playing days. On January 2, 1989, Hatfield became the first former player to coach his alma mater in the Cotton Bowl Classic.  Arkansas's Southwest Conference championship in 1989 is the program's last conference title to date.

Hatfield had a somewhat frosty relationship with longtime Arkansas athletic director Frank Broyles, even though Broyles had been his coach during his playing days.  Broyles had a reputation for being very hands-on with the football program he had built into a national power as head coach from 1958 to 1976.  As good as Hatfield's last two Razorback teams had been, he lost several recruits after 1987 when rival coaches claimed he was in Broyles' doghouse. When Broyles signed a new five-year contract in early 1990, Hatfield left for Clemson University without even visiting the campus.  Later, when Hatfield was asked if Broyles had been a factor in his abrupt departure from Fayetteville, he replied, "His name is on the (athletics) building down there.  Let that be my answer."  Ironically, the coach Hatfield succeeded at Clemson, Danny Ford, would eventually become the Razorbacks' coach in 1993.

Clemson
Hatfield coached at Clemson from 1990 to 1993, compiling a 32–13–1 record. He did much to clean up the program's image in the aftermath of sanctions from the Ford era. In his second season, 1991, he led the Tigers to their last ACC title in the pre-championship game era. However, Hatfield was never really accepted by Clemson's fans.  A common saying among Tiger fans during this time was "Howard built it. Ford filled it. Hatfield killed it."

Largely due to this discontent, school officials refused to grant him a one-year extension on his contract after the 1993 season, even though the Tigers had rebounded from 5–6 in 1992 (Clemson's first losing season in 16 years) to a solid 8–3 record that year and a Peach Bowl appearance.  Angered at what he saw as a lack of support, Hatfield resigned at the end of the regular season.

Rice
Soon afterward, Hatfield was hired at Rice University, where he compiled a 55–78–1 record before resigning on November 30, 2005 following a 1–10 season.  He only had three winning seasons in 12 years.  Although the Owls were bowl-eligible in those three winning seasons, they weren't invited to a bowl in part because of the school's small alumni and fan base.  Rice is the second-smallest school in Division I FBS and often had to play schools 10 times its size or more (and in some cases, with more freshmen than it has students), a major reason why he wasn't as successful as he had been at his previous stops.  In his first year, despite a losing overall record, he managed to lead the Owls to a share of the Southwest Conference title and a victory over the rival Texas Longhorns on national TV.

Football coaching philosophy
One of the few remaining proponents of the conservative triple-option offense in college football, Hatfield compiled a 168–140–4 record as a head coach.

On November 25, 2014 It was announced that Hatfield was chosen as the recipient of the 2015 Amos Alonzo Stagg Award.

Notable players
Notable players that Hatfield coached include:

RB/KR Bobby Joe Edmonds (Arkansas) 
RB James Rouse (Arkansas) 
OL Freddie Childress (Arkansas) 
OL Jim Mabry (Arkansas) 
PK Kendall Trainor (Arkansas) 
QB Quinn Grovey (Arkansas) 
RB Barry Foster (Arkansas)
S Steve Atwater (Arkansas)
DE Wayne Martin (Arkansas)
K/P Nelson Welch (Clemson)
S Brian Dawkins (Clemson)
DE N. D. Kalu (Rice)
LB Larry Izzo (Rice)

Controversy regarding homosexual players
A story in the November 1, 2002 issue of the Chronicle of Higher Education quoted Hatfield saying that he "would not necessarily kick a player off the team for being gay, he probably would think hard about it." In the article, he cited his religious beliefs as the motivation for his stance. Soon after the publication, the Rice University faculty unanimously voted to repudiate Hatfield's comments, and Hatfield apologized for his comments. He continued to coach the Owls until 2005.

Head coaching record

Notes

See also
 List of NCAA major college football yearly punt and kickoff return leaders
 List of presidents of the American Football Coaches Association

References

External links
 

1943 births
Living people
Air Force Falcons football coaches
American football defensive backs
Arkansas Razorbacks football coaches
Arkansas Razorbacks football players
Clemson Tigers football coaches
Florida Gators football coaches
Rice Owls football coaches
Tennessee Volunteers football coaches
People from Helena, Arkansas
Players of American football from Arkansas
College Football Playoff Selection Committee members